Lillias Campbell Davidson (1853–1934) was an American-born British writer.
She founded the Lady Cyclists' Association. In 2018, the New York Times published a belated obituary.

Life
According to Elizabeth Robins Pennell, another American cyclist in London at the same time, Davidson was employed by Bicycling News and the Cyclists' Touring Club Gazette.

She lived for a time with Alice Werner, a teacher of Bantu, and Ménie Muriel Dowie, a British writer of the New Woman school. According to the New York Times:

Works

Non-fiction
 Hints to Lady Travellers at Home and Abroad, Iliffe & Son: London, 1889. ; London: Elliott and Thompson, 2011. , 
 Handbook for Lady Cyclists, Hay Nisbett & Co, c.1896
 Catherine of Bragança : Infanta of Portugal and Queen-Consort of England, J Murray, 1908; (Classic Reprint), Forgotten Books, 2016 

Fiction
 Houses of Clay, S W Partridge, 19-- 
 Second Lieutenant Celia, Bliss Sands, 1898
 For Lack of Love, Horace Marshall & Son, 1900
 The Theft of a Heart, C Arthur Pearson, 1902
 The Confessions of a Matchmaking Mother, J F Taylor, 1902. 
 Purple and Fine Linen, Ward, Lock & Co, 1916
 A Girl's Battle ... With six illustrations. London, 1933. 

Serialised
 The Twentieth of June, 1887
 The Young Man from Chicago, 1900
 Thief and Heiress, 1911
 The Touchstone, 1912
 The Marriage Trap: The Story of a Woman's Sin and a Young Man's Folly, 1912

 Footnotes 

Further reading

 Julie Wosk,  Women and the Machine: Representations From the Spinning Wheel to the Electronic Age (Johns Hopkins University Press, 2001, 2003).  See chapter  "Women and the Bicycle".
 Amanda Hess, "Lillias Campbell Davidson, Who Founded the First Women’s Cycling Organization," New York Times,'' March 8, 2018.

British non-fiction writers
British women non-fiction writers
British female cyclists
American expatriates in England
1853 births
1934 deaths